Brian Kasinda (born 31 December 1997) is a Zambian sprinter. He competed in the 60 metres at the 2016 IAAF World Indoor Championships without advancing from the first round.

Competition record

1Did not start in the final

2Disqualified in the final

Personal bests
Outdoor
100 metres – 10.20 (+0.1 m/s, Lusaka 2016)
200 metres – 21.02 (+1.0 m/s, Gaborone 2014)
Indoor
60 metres – 6.80 (Portland 2016)

References

External links

1997 births
Living people
Zambian male sprinters
Place of birth missing (living people)
Athletes (track and field) at the 2014 Summer Youth Olympics
Athletes (track and field) at the 2015 African Games
African Games competitors for Zambia